How to Compose Popular Songs That Will Sell is the fifth solo studio album from Irish singer, Bob Geldof. It was released on 12 October 2010. How to Compose Popular Songs That Will Sell is Geldof's first album since 2001's Sex, Age & Death, and marks his return to the Mercury Records label. The album reached no. 89 on the UK Albums Chart in its week of entry on 13 February 2011.

Track listing

All songs written by Bob Geldof, except as noted.

 "How I Roll" (Geldof, Pete Briquette, Eliza Gilkyson) – 3:03
 "Blowfish" (Geldof, Briquette) – 4:07
 "She's a Lover" – 4:30
 "To Live in Love" – 4:05
 "Silly Pretty Thing" – 4:02
 "Systematic 6-Pack" – 3:31
 "Dazzled by You" – 2:41
 "Mary Says" (Geldof, Briquette) – 4:52
 "Blow" – 4:55
 "Here's to You" – 7:59

Singles
 "Silly Pretty Thing" (January 2011)
 "Here's To You" (April 2011)

Personnel

The Band:
Bob Geldof - lead vocals, backing vocals, electric & acoustic guitar, ukulele, harmonica, Jews harp
Pete Briquette - bass, keyboards, electric guitar, programming, percussion
Alan Dunn - piano, keyboards, accordion, backing vocals
John Turnbull - electric & acoustic guitar, ukulele, backing vocals
Vince Lovepump - violin, mandolin, Portuguese guitar, backing vocals
Jim Russell - drums, percussion, backing vocals
Niall Power - drums, percussion, backing vocals

Guest Musicians:
Roger Taylor - backing vocals, percussion (on "Here's To You")
Henry Dagg - musical saw
Gary Roberts - electric guitar
Tash Roper - clarinet, backing vocals
Joshua J. Macrae - percussion
Darrell Willis - hand claps, verbals

Production Credits: 
Pete Briquette - producer
Joshua J. Macrae -  engineer
James Clarke - engineer (Faversham)

Recorded at The Priory Studios, Surrey; Briquette Studios, Acton, and Bob's house.

References

2010 albums
Bob Geldof albums
Mercury Records albums